Punctapinella marginipunctata is a species of moth of the family Tortricidae. It is found in Bolivia.

The wingspan is about 23 mm. The ground colour of the forewings is white, preserved in the form of spots and blotches. The remaining area of the wing is brownish with brown marks. The hindwings are creamish with brownish-grey spots.

Etymology
The species name refers to the presence of white forewing spots and is derived from Latin margo (meaning a margin) and punctata (meaning spotted).

References

Moths described in 2013
Euliini
Moths of South America
Invertebrates of Bolivia